San Diego Humane Society,  is a non-profit organization in San Diego, California with five campuses in San Diego County - El Cajon, Escondido, Oceanside, San Diego and Ramona. They are an open-admission shelter and are zero euthanasia for healthy and treatable shelter animals. The organization's programs include sheltering and adopting animals, humane law enforcement, practicing and advancing the field of Shelter Medicine, rescuing animals in emergency situations, wildlife rehabilitation, the country's first 24/7 kitten nursery, positive reinforcement behavior training, providing adult and youth education programs, providing free pet food and supplies to families in need, sharing animals through pet-assisted therapy and more. San Diego Humane Society provides animal services for 14 cities in San Diego County and cares for nearly 50,000 animals a year.

Mission statement
Create a more humane world by inspiring compassion, providing hope and advancing the welfare of animals and people.

History 
The San Diego Humane Society and SPCA was organized on March 10, 1880 by George W. Marston and George W. Hazzard, and is the oldest and largest humane society in San Diego County. 54 years later the organization signed a contract with the City of San Diego to run the shelter under the supervision of San Diego County Department of Health. In 1951, the first animals were moved to the original site, located on Sherman Street (formerly a milk plant). The lease was set to expire in 2000 and the city of San Diego asked San Diego Humane Society to consider building a new facility adjacent to the proposed County Animal Services facility on Gaines Street. The Humane Society accepted and opened the facility in 2002.

Fives years later and after the Asilomar Accords were adopted by several animal care agencies nationwide, the San Diego Animal Welfare Coalition was formed so that local animal welfare organizations could work together to reduce the euthanasia of healthy or treatable companion animals in San Diego County. San Diego Humane Society remains a part of the coalition to this day.

In 2009, San Diego Humane Society opened its Kitten Nursery, which delivers 24-hour care to infant kittens before they become eligible for adoption. The Kitten Nursery was the first program of its kind and has provided a model for other shelters ever since.

Through merger agreements, San Diego Humane Society absorbed the former North County Humane Society & SPCA in Oceanside, California in 2010, and the Escondido Humane Society in Escondido, California in 2014.

In 2014, San Diego Humane Society merged with PAWS San Diego, to expand programs to help more pet owners keep their pets, making this the largest pet safety net service in San Diego. PAWS San Diego provided essential pet services and support to low-income seniors, chronically ill and disabled individuals. After merging, this vital community service kept its name and became the official safety net program of San Diego Humane Society.

Later in 2014, San Diego Humane Society merged with Project Wildlife, the primary local resource for animal rehabilitation, conservation, and wildlife education. They opened the Pilar & Chuck Bahde Wildlife Center in 2019.

In 2018, San Diego Humane Society began providing animal services to six additional cities in San Diego County, marking the biggest milestone in their 138-year history. They are now serving more than 2.2 million people across 620 square miles.

In winter of that year, San Diego Humane Society opened the Pilar & Chuck Bahde Center for Shelter Medicine – the first of its kind in California. The Bahde Center offers a comprehensive shelter medicine regime to homeless pets and serves as a teaching hospital to train the shelter veterinarians of tomorrow.

In September 2019, they opened a new Behavior Center facility where behavior experts work systematically to address complex challenges such as anxiety, fear, resource guarding, overstimulation, and other behavioral issues. Animals in the Behavior Center have individual rehabilitation plans to help them become adoptable.

July 2020
The PAWS name was retired in July 2020 after six years of integrating the work of PAWS San Diego throughout San Diego Humane Society. The Society introduced a new model called Human Animal Support Services (HASS).

September 2020
San Diego Humane Society welcomed its Ramona Campus. The former Fund for Animals Wildlife Center in Ramona had been part of the Humane Society of the United States for more than two decades. With this new 13-acre Ramona Wildlife Center, the work of Project Wildlife expanded to protect and care for more injured and orphaned wildlife throughout Southern California, including native apex predators such as bears, coyotes and birds of prey.

October 2020
San Diego Humane Society opened the El Cajon Campus, taking over the management of the El Cajon Animal Shelter — marking the first time in our 140-year history to have a shelter presence in East County. At this fifth campus, SDHS shelters and cares for animals in El Cajon, La Mesa and Santee. Additionally, Humane Law Enforcement provides dispatch and field services for El Cajon seven days a week.

January 2021
California Governor Gavin Newsom signed Bella’s Act (Assembly Bill 2152) in September 2020 to go into law on Jan. 1 to prohibit the retail sales of dogs, cats and rabbits in California. This is the first bill San Diego Humane Society sponsored. AB 2152, written by California State Assemblymember Todd Gloria (D-San Diego), puts an end to a supply of animals who have been bred and raised in unhealthy and inhumane conditions in out-of-state puppy mills.

Finances
San Diego Humane Society is a private, nonprofit organization that is funded through a combination of contract funding from cities for which they provide animal services, philanthropic contributions, grants, bequests, investments, and fees for services (e.g. adoption fees). Currently, the organization has 600 employees and more than 5,000 volunteers.

Events 
San Diego Humane Society hosts the annual "Fur Ball," a  dog-friendly fundraiser for the animals at San Diego Humane Society. Fur Ball tickets include an evening of a hosted bar cocktail reception; on-site raffle; live and silent auctions; exquisite vegetarian dinner and wine selections, and dancing to live music.

Humane Law Enforcement

San Diego Humane Society employs humane law officers dedicated to protecting animals throughout San Diego County by providing animal services and enforcing animal cruelty and neglect laws. San Diego Humane Society’s Humane Law Enforcement has officers in the field seven days a week, handling a variety of animal cruelty complaints. Humane Officers get their enforcement powers from the California Corporations Code 14502, and can exercise the powers of a peace officer while investigating animal-related crimes. Humane Officers are appointed by the State and undergo substantial training in animal care, state humane laws and continue education throughout their careers. They have jurisdictional authority anywhere in the State of California, however their primary area of responsibility is the County of San Diego. Officers are issued TASER devices, collapsible baton, and OC Spray as defensive weapons. Prior to 2004, officers who had completed the required training were permitted to carry firearms, however the agency no longer permits this.

Not only can San Diego Humane Society Officers issue citations, make arrests, file criminal charges and serve warrants, they also respond and rescue animals in disaster situations in San Diego and surrounding areas with the assistance of the Humane Society’s 24-hour volunteer-operated Emergency Response Team. Officers and ERT members provide emergency assistance to animals near and far and work with San Diego Humane Society's Community Engagement Department speaking to children throughout San Diego County.

The Society's Humane Law Enforcement Division also operates its own communications center, responsible for providing dispatch services and mutual aid communications for officers at the Society's three campuses. The agency uses the San Diego-Imperial County Regional Communications System as its communications network, enabling seamless communications with other agencies in their jurisdiction.

Humane Law Officers resolved 24,451 cases in the 2018-2019 fiscal year.

Awareness on Abuse
San Diego Humane Society responded to 1,800 animal abuse reports in 2013. Most of the calls required pet owner education, but 20 calls brought criminal charges. Kelli Herwehe, San Diego Humane Society public relations coordinator told The Coast News “It’s important for people to know the signs to look for,” Herwehe said. “Animals can’t talk. We need to be their voice.” The organization is focused on educating the public. "“About 90 percent is educating the public,” Herwehe said. “It’s not intentional cruelty or neglect.” But the 10% of legitimate cases go to the Society's Humane Law Enforcement Division.

In the 2018-19 fiscal year, they responded to 2,808 cruelty complaints.

References
http://www.sdhumane.org/

http://thecoastnews.com/2013/04/humane-society-raises-awareness-on-abuses/

Animal charities based in the United States
Animal shelters in the United States